Central Township, Nebraska may refer to the following places in Nebraska:

 Central Township, Knox County, Nebraska
 Central Township, Merrick County, Nebraska

See also
Central Township (disambiguation)

Nebraska township disambiguation pages